Amrita Basu is an American academic and political scientist. She currently is a professor at Amherst College where she holds affiliations in the departments of Political Science, Sexuality, Women's, & Gender Studies, Asian Languages & Civilizations, and Black Studies.

Early life 
Amrita Basu was born in December 1953 in New York, United States. She is the daughter of parents who worked for the United Nations. Her mother worked on various issues relating to women, and her father worked on issues pertaining to economics. She speaks Hindi, English and Punjabi and possesses moderate conversational abilities in French.

Education and career

Basu obtained her Bachelors in Government with a minor in Asian studies from Cornell University in Ithaca, New York in 1975. In 1977, Basu obtained her Masters in Political Science from Columbia University with a Certificate from the South Asian Institute. Basu graduated from Columbia University with a Ph.D. in Political Science in 1984.

Starting in 1981, Basu has taught in the Political Science department at Amherst College, first as an Assistant Professor. In addition, she served as a visiting scholar at Columbia University during the 1986-1987 academic year. In 1988, she was promoted to Associate Professor at Amherst College. In 1994 she was promoted to Professor at Amherst College, where she continues to serve. In 2003 her position was endowed as the Domenic J. Paino 1955 Professor of Political Science and Sexuality, Women's, & Gender Studies.

From 2001-2005 she served as the Director of the Five Colleges Women's Studies Research Center. From 2007 to 2010 she served as the Associate Dean of Faculty at Amherst College.

Academic honours and fellowships 
In 1975, Amrita Basu was awarded with the Columbia University Fellowship and in 1979, she was awarded the Pre-Doctoral Junior Fellowship by the American Institute of Indian Studies. In 1980, she was bestowed with the Dissertation Fellowship by the Woodrow Wilson Foundation. From 1981 to 1983, she undertook the Faculty Development Project, Black Studies/Women Studies and in 1984, she was felicitated with Karl Loewenstein Fellowship, Amherst College. In 1990, Basu was awarded the Fulbright Commission Senior Fellowship which she declined. In the same year, was endowed with American Institute of Indian Studies Senior Fellowship. In 1991 she received the Senior Fellowship from Social Science Research Council and was also awarded with the Amherst College Research Award for the academic years 1991-1992, 1993-1994 and 1997-1998. In 1992 and 1993, she was awarded the Five College Asian-American Studies Curriculum Development Grant and Peace and the World Security Studies Curriculum Development Grant respectively. In 1993, she was rewarded with John D & Catherine T. MacArthur Foundation, Research and Writing Award. In 1994, she was felicitated with Peace and World Security Studies Program Curriculum Development Grant and in 1995 she was granted the right to convene a conference on Political Violence in India at The United States Institute for Peace. In 1998, she was awarded with the Ford Foundation Curriculum Development Grant. She was awarded the Distinguished Teaching Award at Amherst College in 2008, and she was conferred as the Commencement Speaker, Senior Assembly, Amherst College. She also served on the Social Sciences jury for the Infosys Prize in 2012.

Publications

Books 

 Basu, Amrita. "Violent Conjunctures in Democratic India" (Cambridge University Press, Contentious Politics
Series, 2015)
 Basu, Amrita. Two Faces of Protest: Contrasting Modes of Women’s Activism in India. University of California Press and Oxford University Press: New Delhi, 1992
 Basu, Amrita, ed, The Challenge of Local Feminisms: Women’s Movements in Global Perspective. Boulder: Westview Press, 1995 and New Delhi: Kali for Women, 1998
 Basu, Amrita, co-ed. Community Conflicts and the State in India. Delhi: Oxford University Press, 1997
 Basu, Amrita, co-ed.  Appropriating Gender: Women’s Activism and Politicized Religion in South Asia. New York: Routledge and New Delhi: Kali for Women, 1998
 Basu, Amrita, co-ed. Localizing Knowledge in a Globalizing World. Syracuse University Press, 2002
 Basu, Amrita, co-ed, Beyond Exceptionalism: Violence, Religion and Democracy in India. Seagull Press: New Delhi and London, 2006
 Basu, Amrita, ed, Women's Movements in the Global Era: The Power of Local Feminisms. Westview Press: Boulder, CO, 2010.

Articles and contributions to edited books 

 “More than Meets the Eye: Sub-Rosa Violence in Hindu Nationalist India,” in Karen Barkey and Sudipto Kaviraj ed, Democracy and Religious Pluralism, (Cambridge University Press, forthcoming)
 Commentary on “The Systematic Study of Women’s Movements in Western Democracies and the Difference It Makes” Politics, Groups and Identities, (Vol. 4, Issue 4, 2016)
 “Women, dynasties and democracy in India,” in Kanchan Chandra ed., Democratic Dynasties: State, Party and Family in Contemporary Indian Politics (Cambridge University Press, 2016)
 “The Long March from Ayodhya to Godhra: Civil Society and the State in Service of "Hindutva,” in Wendy Doniger and Martha Nussbaum ed., Pluralism and Democracy in India: Debating the Hindu Right, (New York; Oxford University Press, 2015) 2
 Co-Authored with Atul Kohli, chapter on India, in Mark Kesselman, Joel Krieger and William Joseph eds., Introduction To Comparative Politics, (Boston: Houghton Mifflin Co., 2003, 2008, 2011, 2014, forthcoming 2017)
 “Who Secures Women’s Capabilities in Martha Nussbaum’s Quest for Social Justice? “ Columbia Journal of Gender and Law, (Vol. 19, No. 1, 2010) [Reprinted in Thomas Bloom, ed.,Justice and the Capabilities Approach, (Ashgate, 2010]
 “Gender and Politics,” Oxford Companion to Politics in India, (New Delhi: Oxford University Press, 2010)
 “As the Empire Falls: Lessons Learned and Unlearned in America’s Asia,” Critical Asian Studies,41:3, 2009
 “Women, Political Parties and Social Movements in South Asia,” in Anne Marie Goetz ed., Governing Women: Women’s Political Effectiveness in Contexts of Democratization and Governance Reform, (NY: Routledge, 2009)
 “Commentary on Transnational Feminism,” Feminist Africa, Issue 5, 2005
 “Women, Political Parties and Social Movements in South Asia,” Occasional Paper No. 5, United Nations Research Institute for Social Development, July 2005
 Co-authored, “Prose After Gujarat: Violence, Secularism and Democracy in India,” in Mushirul Hasan ed., Will Secular India Survive? (New Delhi: Imprint One, 2004)
 “The Europeanization of American Racism or a New Racial Hybrid? Souls, Vol. 4, No. 3, 1 May 2002 [Reprinted in Manning Marable and Vanessa Agard Jones Ed, Transnational Blackness: Navigating the Global Color Line, Palgrave, Macmillan, 2008]
 “Globalizing Local Women’s Movements”, in Basu et al, Localizing Knowledge In a Globalizing World (Syracuse University Press, 2002)
 “Parliamentary Democracy as a Historical Phenomenon, The CPM in West Bengal,” in Zoya Hasan ed., Parties and Party Politics in India, (Delhi: Oxford University Press, 2002)
 “Counterpoints: Roundtable on Peace,” Meridians: feminism, race, transnationalism, (Vol. 2, No. 1, 2001)
 “The Dialectics of Hindu Nationalism,” in Atul Kohli ed., The Success of India’sDemocracy, (Cambridge University Press, 2001)
 “Globalization of the Local/Localization of the Global: Mapping Transnational Women’s Movements,
 ” Meridians: feminism, race, transnationalism. (Vol. 1, No. 1, Autumn 2000) “Best Books in Political Science and Women’s Studies,” Women’s Review of Books, Millennial Issue, 2000
 “Communalism Engendered: Men as Victims, Women as Agents,” in Julia Leslie ed., InventedIdentities: The Interplay of Gender, Religion and Politics in India (Delhi: Oxford University Press, 2000)
 “Of Men, Women and Bombs: India’s Nuclear Explosions,” Dissent, (Vol. 46, No. 1, Winter 1999)
 “Rethinking Communalism and Fundamentalism: Women’s Activism and Religious Politics in India,
 ” Special Issue on Women and 20th Century Religion, Journal of Women’s History, (Vol. 10, No. 4, Winter 1999)
 “The Changing Fortunes of the Bharatiya Janata Party,” in Atul Kohli and Prerna Singh edited,Handbook of Indian Politics, (Routledge, 2012)
 “Rethinking Social Movements/Rethinking Hindu Nationalism,” in John Zavos et al. edited,Public Hinduism, (Sage Publications, 2012)
 “Introduction,” in Jeffery and Basu eds., Appropriating Gender: Women’s Activism and Politicized Religion in South Asia (NY: Routledge 1997, New Delhi: Kali for Women, 1998)
 “Hindu Women’s Activism and the Questions that it Raises,” in Jeffery and Basu eds.,Appropriating Gender: Women’s Activism and Politicized Religion in South Asia (NY: Routledge 1997, New Delhi: Kali for Women, 1998) (Reprinted in Betsy Reed ed.,Nothing Sacred: Women Respond to Religious Fundamentalism and Terror, (NY: Thunder Mouth Press/Nation Books, 2002)
 “Reflections on Community Conflicts and the State in India,” Journal of Asian Studies,(Vol. 56, No. 2, May 1997)
 “Mass Movement or Elite Conspiracy? The Puzzle of Hindu Nationalism,” in David Ludden, ed., Contesting the Nation: Religion, Community and the Politics of Democracy in India (The University of Pennsylvania Press, New Delhi: Oxford University Press, 1996)
 “When The Center Does Not Hold: Hindu Nationalism and State Decay,” Harvard International Review, (Vol. 2, Summer 1996)
 “The Gendered Imagery and Women’s Leadership of Hindu Nationalism,” Reproductive Health Matters, (No. 8, November 1996)
 “Why Local Riots Are Not Simply Local: Collective Violence and The State in Bijnor, India 1988-1993,” Theory and Society (Vol. 24, 1995)
 “Introduction,” in Basu ed., The Challenge of Local Feminisms: Women’s Movements In Global Perspective, (Boulder: Westview Press, 1995)
 “When Local Riots Are Not Merely Local, Bringing the State Back In: Bijnor, 1988-1992,”Economic and Political Weekly (Bombay, Vol. XXIX, No. 40, October 1, 1994) [Reprinted in Rajeev Bhargav and Partha Chatterjee eds., Politics In India (Delhi: Oxford University Press, 1997)]
 “Bhopal Revisited: The View From Below,” The Bulletin of Concerned Asian Scholars (Vol. 26, Nos. 1 & 2, January - June 1994: 3-14) [Reprinted in Bridget Hanna , Ward Morehouse, and Satnath Sarangi, The Bhopal Reader, Twenty Years of the World’s Worst Industrial Disaster, (NY: The Apex Press, 2006)]
 “Feminism Inverted: The Gendered Imagery and Real Women of Hindu Nationalism,” The Bulletin of Concerned Asian Scholars (Vol. 25, No. 4, 1993) [Reprinted in Urvashi Butalia and Tanika Sarkar eds., Women and The Hindu Right, (New Delhi: Kali for Women, 1995)]
 “The State and Agrarian Transformation in India,” Comparative Politics, (Vol. 22, No. 4, 1990: 483-500)
 “Indigenous Feminism, Tribal Radicalism and Grass Roots Mobilization in India,” Dialectical Anthropology, (Vol. 15, Nos. 2 & 3, 1990: 193-209)
 “Democratic Centralism in The Home and The World: Women and The Communist Party in West Bengal,” Sonia Kruks, Rayna Rapp and Marilyn Young, eds., Promissory Notes: Women in the Transition to Socialism (NY: Monthly Review Press, 1989).
 “Grass Roots Movements and The State: Reflections on Radical Change in India,” Theory & Society, (Vol. 16, 1987: 647-674).
 “Complexities of Theory and Practice: The Women’s Movement in India,” The Barnard Occasional Papers on Women’s Issues, (Vol. 2, No. 3, 1987) 4
 “Two Steps Forward, One Step Backwards: The Non-Governmental Women’s Forum in Nairobi,”Signs: Journal of Women in Culture and Society, (Vol. 11, No. 3, Spring 1986)
 “Class, Communalism and Official Complicity: India After Indira” (co-authored), Monthly Review,(Vol. 36, No. 8, January 1985)
 “Studies in Power and Powerlessness: Women in Contemporary India,” Trends in History, (Vol. 4, No. 1, Fall 1985)
 “Two Faces of Protest: Alternative Forms of Women’s Mobilization in Bengal and Maharashtra,” in Gail Minault, ed., The Extended Family: Women’s Political Participation in South Asia,(Columbia, Missouri: South Asia Books, 1981).

Guest editor 

 With Austin Sarat, “Political Science as a Liberal Arts Subject,” Polity (Vol. 46, 81-84, January 2014)
 With Inderpal Grewal, Caren Kaplan and Liisa Mallki, special issue on Gender and Globalization,Signs, (Vol. 26, No. 4, Summer 2001)
 With Paula Giddings, Inderpal Grewal and Kamala Visveshvaran eds., “September 11th: A Feminist Archive,” Meridians: feminism, race, transnationalism, (Vol. 2, No. 2, 2002)
 With Atul Kohli, special issue, “Community Conflicts and the State in India,” in The Journal of Asian Studies, (Vol. 56, No. 2, May 1997)
 With “Women and Religious Nationalism,” Bulletin of Concerned Asian Scholars, (Vol. 25, # 4, 1993).

See also 
 Feminist economics
 List of feminist economists

References

External links 
 Home page International Association for Feminist Economics (IAFFE)
Home page Feminist Economics journal

1953 births
Living people
American feminists
Feminist economists
Columbia Graduate School of Arts and Sciences alumni
Cornell University alumni
Amherst College faculty
American women political scientists
American political scientists
American women academics
21st-century American women